HMS Whaddon (L45) was a Type I Hunt-class destroyer of the Royal Navy built by Alexander Stephen & Sons of Linthouse, Govan and launched on 16 July 1940. She was laid down on 27 July 1939 and commissioned 28 February 1941. She was adopted by the civil community of Newport Pagnell in Buckinghamshire, as part of the Warship Week campaign in 1942.

Service history
During 1941 and 1942 she was on North Sea Convoy escort duties.

She was then allocated to the Mediterranean Fleet in March 1943 where she undertook escort and patrol duties and provided cover for the allied landings in Sicily and Salerno.

On 29 September 1945 Whaddon sailed from Gibraltar to Devonport and was placed in reserve. She was scrapped at Faslane in April 1959. She has since had a British Sea Cadet Corps unit named after it, T.S Whaddon.

References

Publications

External links
 Profile on naval-history.net

 

Hunt-class destroyers of the Royal Navy
Ships built on the River Clyde
1940 ships
World War II destroyers of the United Kingdom